The 2015–16 Florida Panthers season was the 23rd season for the National Hockey League franchise that was established on June 14, 1993. The Panthers' regular season began on October 10, 2015, against the Philadelphia Flyers with a 7–1 home win. The Panthers won the Atlantic Division but fell in six games in the opening round of the playoffs to the wild card entrant New York Islanders.

Standings

Schedule and results

Pre-season

Regular season

Playoffs

Player stats 
Final stats

Skaters

Goaltenders

†Denotes player spent time with another team before joining the Panthers. Stats reflect time with the Panthers only.
‡Denotes player was traded mid-season. Stats reflect time with the Panthers only.
Bold/italics denotes franchise record.

Awards and honours

Awards

Milestones

Transactions 
The Panthers were involved in the following transactions during the 2015–16 season:

Trades

Notes
Detroit to retain 15% ($720,000) of salary as part of trade.
Conditional on Yandle signing with Panthers.

Free agents acquired

Free agents lost

Claimed via waivers

Lost via waivers

Lost via retirement

Player signings

Draft picks

Below are the Florida Panthers' selections at the 2015 NHL Entry Draft, held on June 26–27, 2015 at the BB&T Center in Sunrise, Florida.

Draft notes

 The Florida Panthers' second-round pick went to the New York Rangers as the result of a trade on June 27, 2015, that sent Carl Hagelin and a second and sixth-round pick in 2015 (59th and 179th overall) to Anaheim in exchange for Emerson Etem and this pick.
Anaheim previously acquired this pick as the result of a trade on June 26, 2015, that sent Kyle Palmieri to New Jersey in exchange for a third-round pick in 2016 and this pick.
New Jersey previously acquired this pick as the result of a trade on February 26, 2015, that sent Jaromir Jagr to Florida in exchange for a conditional third-round pick in 2016 and this pick.
 The Florida Panthers' third-round pick went to the Tampa Bay Lightning as the result of a trade on June 26, 2015, that sent the Rangers' first-round pick in 2015 (28th overall) to the New York Islanders in exchange for Edmonton's second-round pick in 2015 (33rd overall) and this pick.
The Islanders previously acquired this pick as the result of a trade on June 28, 2014, that sent a third-round pick in 2014 to Florida in exchange for this pick.
 The Pittsburgh Penguins' third-round pick went to the Florida Panthers as the result of a trade on March 5, 2014, that sent Marcel Goc to Pittsburgh in exchange for a fifth-round pick in 2014 and this pick.
 The Anaheim Ducks' third-round pick went to the Florida Panthers as the result of a trade on February 28, 2015, that sent Tomas Fleischmann to Anaheim in exchange for Dany Heatley and this pick.
 The St. Louis Blues' seventh-round pick went to the Florida Panthers as the result of a trade on September 28, 2013, that sent Scott Timmins and a sixth-round pick in 2014 to New Jersey in exchange for Krys Barch and this pick.
New Jersey previously acquired this pick as the result of a trade on March 22, 2013, that sent a conditional fourth-round pick to St. Louis in exchange for Matt D'Agostini and this pick.

References

Florida Panthers seasons
Florida Panthers season, 2015-16
Florida Panthers
Florida Panthers